Dactyloceras vingerhoedti is a moth in the family Brahmaeidae. It was described by Thierry Bouyer in 2005. It is found in Tanzania.

References

Endemic fauna of Tanzania
Brahmaeidae
Moths described in 2005